Total Sex is the second full-length studio album by power electronics band Whitehouse, which was released in November 1980 through Come Organisation, only a few months after the band's debut, Birthdeath Experience. The album was reissued twice, first on CD in 1994 through Susan Lawly, and again in 2008 on double vinyl format through Very Friendly. The original release was limited to 1,200 copies on vinyl, the first pressing consisted of 800 copies, the second consisted of 400 copies on translucent green vinyl.

Both reissue versions of the album came with two bonus tracks: "Her Entry" and "Foreplay", both of which originated from the Hoisting the Black Flag compilation.

Track listing

Note: Track 4 is approximately ten seconds of feedback with the remaining time being silent

Personnel
William Bennett - vocals, synthesizers
Paul Reuter - synthesizers
Peter McKay - engineering
George Peckham - mastering

References

External links
  (List of releases)
Whitehouse 1980-1981 recording dossier at Susan Lawly

1980 albums
Whitehouse (band) albums